The 1994 Missouri Valley Conference men's basketball tournament was played after the conclusion of the 1993–1994 regular season at the St. Louis Arena in St. Louis, Missouri.

Cam Johnson of Northern Iowa was named the tournament MVP.

Bracket

References

1993–94 Missouri Valley Conference men's basketball season
Missouri Valley Conference men's basketball tournament
Missouri Valley Conference men's basketball tournament
College basketball tournaments in Missouri
Basketball competitions in St. Louis